"The Race" is an episode of the British comedy television series The Goodies. The episode was written by The Goodies, with songs and music by Bill Oddie.

Plot
On holiday in France, the Goodies are riding leisurely through the countryside on their trandem when they suddenly become aware of a large number of cyclists riding very rapidly behind them. The Goodies speed up to escape the onslaught, and as a result of this, cross the finishing line of the Tour de France before the competitors. The Goodies are awarded the prize, as the winners of the Tour de France, because of crossing the line in first place.

As a result of their success in winning the Tour de France so easily, Graeme becomes obsessed with them winning the Le Mans 24-hour race. However, there is a problem—they do not have a car, and none of the Goodies are able to drive a car.

Tim volunteers to drive the car in the race, despite not being able to drive, and Graeme instructs him how to drive (by reading from a book)—doing so in a substitute 'car' consisting of two living room chairs (for driver and passenger), as well as a large plate as a steering wheel, a wooden spoon for the gear shift, and Bill's feet as the brake and accelerator. Tim passes his driving test, and all is ready to go.

Graeme designs a sleek-looking racing car, using a photograph of a racing car on which to model his design. He then sets about building a car based on the blue-print of his design. The end result is not anything like the car on the drawing board—it is a chunky strange-looking vehicle, with no windscreen, and special "hand signal" traffic indicators for "turning right", "turning left" and "turning nasty".

There is a villain in their midst—Baron de Boeuf, who is determined to win the race at all costs, and who will stop at nothing to achieve this end. The Baron sabotages the cars of all the entrants, with the result that most of the drivers are forced to withdraw from the race. The Goodies, likewise, are left with no car. However, Graeme is determined not to give in, and he modifies their office into a special type of car, with a window becoming the car's windscreen. Baron de Boeuf immediately tries to destroy the Goodies new "car" so that he will have no rival to worry about. Eventually, the Baron is eliminated from the race, but the adventure for the Goodies continues, with a nail-biting conclusion.

When all seems lost, Graeme reveals yet another surprising feature of his remarkable car.

Notes
 The Race is the last Goodies episode to feature sketch adverts. Initially a filler, the feature had been a staple element in the show since their first series. The Goodies would later revisit the advertisement concept in It Might as Well Be String and Goodies and Politics in series six and eight.

References

 "The Complete Goodies" — Robert Ross, B T Batsford, London, 2000
 "The Goodies Rule OK" — Robert Ross, Carlton Books Ltd, Sydney, 2006
 "From Fringe to Flying Circus — 'Celebrating a Unique Generation of Comedy 1960-1980'" — Roger Wilmut, Eyre Methuen Ltd, 1980
 "The Goodies Episode Summaries" — Brett Allender
 "The Goodies — Fact File" — Matthew K. Sharp

External links
 

The Goodies (series 4) episodes
24 Hours of Le Mans
1974 British television episodes